Rutherglen railway station is in the town centre of Rutherglen, South Lanarkshire, Scotland, and lies on the Argyle Line. The station is served by a single island platform, connected to the street by a footbridge.

History

Earlier stations
The first Rutherglen station was opened on the Caledonian Railway's line to Glasgow on 1 June 1849, or possibly 1842. The side platforms existed beneath today's footbridge at the base of the triangular junction. Serving about 70 passenger trains daily, it was replaced on 31 March 1879 by the second one stretching below the Farmeloan Road bridge. This, and subsequent stations, had both side platforms and island platforms. The third station served the west side and base of the triangle near the respective angle. The fourth station at the mid east side of the triangle complemented the third one. Despite the three rebuilds, access remained a concern.

Passenger services to London Road station, that began 1 April 1879, ceased when the Glasgow Central Railway underground commenced on 1 November 1895.  Services on the latter route were withdrawn as part of the Beeching Axe on 5 October 1964. Signal boxes have existed at the three angles. In 1973, a central control room in Glasgow replaced the final one at the apex.

On 6 May 1974, the West Coast Main Line (WCML) was opened to electrified services, which included Hamilton Circle services through the slow line island platform.

1979 station

Routes

No longer accessible to the public, but still visible, the former WCML island platform was closed when the new one opened in the vicinity of the fourth station on 5 November 1979 for Argyle Line services along the former route via . Consequently, the DMU services on the Whifflet Line that terminated at Glasgow Central High Level bypassed the stop from 1979. When the Whifflet Line was electrified in December 2014, these trains were rerouted to the Argyle Line and the stop restored.

Eastwards, the Argyle Line formed a connection with the WCML and either diverged to the Whifflet Line, or continued on the WCML towards  before continuing to the southern ends of the Argyle Line (Hamilton Circle,  or ).  Since the 2014 electrification, passengers for stations to Motherwell and Lanark via  have changed at Cambuslang.

Passenger access
Access to the present platform is by a large (covered) footbridge from the Main Street, over the high-level railway to stairs down to the island platform and ticket office. To create a pram friendly and a disability-compliant option, the installation of a lift was completed in April 2009. The level crossing at the opposite end is restricted to staff accessing the nearby First Engineering Training Centre.

2010 M74 works
During 2010, the M74 extension included the motorway flyover at the north end of the platform.

Accidents
1865: A train fatally struck a contractor's employee in the vicinity.

1867: A train ran over and killed  a platelayer.

Several passengers suffered serious injuries.

1876: An eastbound passenger train failed to observe a signal and crashed into the rear of a local passenger train at the station. Damage and injuries were minor.

1880: A westbound passenger express overran a signal and smashed into the rear of a local passenger train departing the station. Although the rolling stock sustained extensive damage, only one passenger suffered a serious injury. The engine driver's four-month sentence was commuted to two months. That year, a signalman, on stepping off the main line to avoid an approaching passenger train, sustained internal injuries on being struck by a coal train on the loop line.

Believing the latter was on a siding, the signalman had given the passenger train a clear signal. Damage was significant and eight passengers sustained cuts and bruises.

1898: A porter seized a passenger, who was boarding a moving train. In attempting to drag him from the compartment, the man dropped between the train and platform. Run over by the wheels, the victim died within hours.

1901: An engine struck a track labourer. Months later, an express fatally struck an employee, who inattentively stepped from a goods van in the station vicinity.

1904: An engine fatally struck a brakeman.

1906: A fireman was crushed between a wagon and engine. Later that year, the wheels of a milk train crushed a porter's foot.

1907: A brakeman sustained a serious head injury when struck from behind by a train.

Believing the first train had passed, the signalman had inadvertently set the signal to red. Twelve passengers suffered fractures or other serious injuries, and 65 minor injuries.

1931: An eastbound passenger train struck a passenger train being shunted about  out of the station. Neither train carrying passengers, no injuries occurred, but one train was partially derailed and a carriage was badly damaged.

1936: Shortly before Rutherglen, a woman inexplicably fell from a westbound passenger train.

1938: An axle failure on a westbound passenger train caused a derailment where the final coach mounted the platform and landed on its side. The aftermath was one fatality and multiple serious injuries.

1940: Fatality, but details unspecified.

1944: Fatality, but details unspecified.

1975: A westbound cement train struck an eastbound passenger train, which was crossing from the slow to fast line on leaving the station. Only one passenger in the four derailed coaches sustained serious injuries.

1977: An express fatally struck a three-year-old boy who had wandered through a broken fence and fallen down an embankment onto the line.

Services

|-
|

|

|}

Footnotes

References

External links

Rutherglen at RailScot
Glasgow, Rutherglen Railway Station (New), Glasgow Low Level Lines, Dalmarnock Branch at Canmore

Railway stations in South Lanarkshire
Buildings and structures in Rutherglen
Former Caledonian Railway stations
Railway stations in Great Britain opened in 1849
Railway stations in Great Britain closed in 1879
Railway stations in Great Britain opened in 1879
Railway stations in Great Britain closed in 1964
Railway stations in Great Britain opened in 1979
SPT railway stations
Railway stations served by ScotRail
1849 establishments in Scotland